Battle of Salamis in Cyprus may refer to two different battles: 

 Battle of Salamis in Cyprus (450 BC)
 Battle of Salamis in Cyprus (306 BC)